There have been two baronetcies created for members of the Pease family, both in the Baronetage of the United Kingdom. Both titles are extant.

The Pease Baronetcy, of Hutton Lowcross and Pinchinthorpe in the County of York, was created in the Baronetage of the United Kingdom on 18 May 1882 for Joseph Pease. He represented South Durham and Barnard Castle in the House of Commons. Pease was the son of Joseph Pease and the grandson of Edward Pease. He was succeeded by his eldest son, the second Baronet. He sat as Member of Parliament for York and Cleveland.

The Pease Baronetcy, of Hummersknott in the County of Durham, was created in the Baronetage of the United Kingdom on 25 June 1920 for the coal magnate Arthur Pease. He was the son of Arthur Pease, younger brother of the first Baronet of the 1882 creation.

In addition, three members of the Pease family have been elevated to the peerage. Jack Pease, 1st Baron Gainford (1917), was the second son of the first Baronet of the 1882 creation. Herbert Pease, 1st Baron Daryngton (1923), was the younger brother of the first Baronet of the 1920 creation. Beaumont Pease, 1st Baron Wardington (1936), Chairman of Lloyds Bank, was a first cousin once removed of the first Baronet of the 1882 creation.

Pease baronets, of Hutton Lowcross and Pinchinthorpe (1882)
 Sir Joseph Whitwell Pease, 1st Baronet (1828–1903)
 Sir Alfred Edward Pease, 2nd Baronet (1857–1939)
 Sir Edward Pease, 3rd Baronet (1880–1963)
 Sir Alfred Vincent Pease, 4th Baronet (1926–2008)
 Sir Joseph Gurney Pease, 5th Baronet (born 1927)

The heir presumptive is the present holder's son, Charles Edward Gurney Pease (b. 1955).

The heir presumptive's heir apparent is his distant cousin, Adrian Christopher Pease, 5th Baron Gainford (b. 1950).

Pease baronets, of Hummersknott (1920)
 Sir Arthur Francis Pease, 1st Baronet (1866–1927)
 Sir Richard Arthur Pease, 2nd Baronet (1890–1969)
 Sir Richard Thorn Pease, 3rd Baronet (1922–2021)
 Sir Richard Peter Pease, 4th Baronet (b. 1958)

The heir presumptive is the current holder's cousin, Jonathan Edward Pease (b. 1952).

The heir presumptive's heir apparent is his brother, Christopher Berkeley Pease (b. 1958), followed by his son, Edward Robert Pease (b. 1991), and by his brother, Arthur David Pease (b. 1961).

See also
 Baron Gainford
 Baron Wardington
 Baron Daryngton
 Pease family

References

External links
 Kidd, Charles, Williamson, David (editors). Debrett's Peerage and Baronetage (1990 edition). New York: St Martin's Press, 1990.
 Joseph Gurney Pease. A Wealth of Happiness and Many Bitter Trials (1992)  The life and journals of Sir Alfred Edward Pease Bt.
 Maurice. W. Kirby. Men of Business and Politics. George Allen & Unwin. 1984. . A study of the rise and fall of the Quaker Pease Dynasty of North East England, 1700–1943.
 

Pease